Benjamin Evans Rector (born November 6, 1986) is an American singer, songwriter and record producer based in Nashville, Tennessee. He has released seven studio albums, including Brand New (2015), which peaked at No. 9 on the Billboard 200, and Magic (2018), which debuted at No. 1 on the Billboard Americana/Folk Albums chart.

Early life 
Rector was born in Tulsa, Oklahoma. He took piano lessons as a child, but he did not pursue music until he picked up guitar in high school, which later led him to begin songwriting. He graduated from Tulsa's Metro Christian Academy in 2005 and from the University of Arkansas in 2010 with a degree in business and marketing.

Music career 
During his first year at the University of Arkansas, Rector released a self-titled EP that featured the song "Conversation", which went on to win the Grand Prize in the Pop category of the John Lennon Songwriting Contest in 2006. He is the youngest person ever to win the award for the pop category. The EP grew popular in surrounding states, and Rector began touring frequently on weekends and during breaks in the school year.

Rector released his first full-length album Twenty Tomorrow in 2007 and its follow-up Songs That Duke Wrote in 2008.

In April 2009, he was given the Northwest Arkansas Music Award (NAMA) for best male singer-songwriter in Northwest Arkansas. Later that year, he moved to Nashville to pursue songwriting and to continue his career as an artist.

Rector's third studio album, Into the Morning, was released on February 16, 2010, and reached No. 11 on Billboards Top Heatseekers chart. Following the release, he co-headlined the Three Amigos Tour with fellow Nashvillians Steve Moakler and Andrew Ripp. The rest of 2010 brought support slots with Dave Barnes and Five for Fighting, The Beat Lives Forever co-headline tour with Drew Holcomb and The Neighbors, and the Feels Like Home tour in Germany, organized by Johannes Strate of the German band Revolverheld.

In early 2011, Rector headlined a tour in the Midwest, supported fellow Nashville artist Matt Wertz's Weights & Wings national release tour, and performed on the VH1 Best Cruise Ever with artists including Train, The Script, Colbie Caillat and Lifehouse.

Rector's fourth studio album Something Like This was released on September 13, 2011, reaching No. 41 on the Billboard 200. In mid-2011, Rector co-produced Steve Moakler's Watching Time Run. Following the release of Something Like This Rector headlined the Good Time Tour which spanned 25 cities with Andrew Belle and Graham Colton as support. Rector supported Needtobreathe during their The Reckoning tour in early 2012, which continued until May 2013.

The Walking in Between was released on August 20, 2013. Produced by Rector, Jamie Kenney and Charlie Peacock, it was the first release on Rector's own Aptly Named Recordings label. The album debuted at No. 16 on the Billboard 200 chart.

In 2014, Rector briefly took a break from songwriting to front the Huey Lewis and the News cover band Newy Lewis and the Hues.

Rector toured with Needtobreathe, Drew Holcomb and the Neighbors, and Colony House for the first leg of the "Tour De Compadres" tour in early 2015. He co-headlined The Rock Boat in 2017, and supported Tim McGraw and Faith Hill on their 2017 Soul2Soul Tour.

Rector released his sixth studio album, Brand New, on August 28, 2015, via Aptly Named Recordings. The album debuted No. 9 on the Billboard 200 chart, marking his first Top 10 album. It also debuted at No. 2 on the Billboard Top Current Rock Albums chart, No. 2 on the Billboard Album Core Genre Rock chart, No. 6 on the Billboard Album Sales chart, No. 3 on the Billboard Top Current Digital Album Sales chart, and No. 1 on the Billboard Top Folk Albums chart.

In January 2016, he was picked as Elvis Duran's Artist of the Month and was featured on NBC's Today show where he live performed his single "Brand New", which initially received airplay on Sirius XM's The Pulse in September 2015. "Brand New" was his first single to enter the Billboard Hot 100, peaking at No. 82. The song also reached No. 6 on the Billboard Adult Top 40, No. 7 on Hot Rock Songs, and No. 10 on the Adult Contemporary chart.

On June 22, 2018, Rector released his seventh studio album, Magic, his first with OK Kid Recordings, which was led by its first single, "Drive". The album debuted at No. 1 on Billboards Americana/Folk Albums chart, and peaked at No. 2 on the Billboard Independent Albums chart and No. 44 on the Billboard 200. In September 2018, Rector embarked on his nationwide tour, Magic: The Tour, that continued into early 2019. In 2019, Rector was nominated for a Daytime Emmy Award for Best Performance for his appearance on Pickler and Ben in 2018.

A live album, Magic: Live From the USA, was recorded during Magic: The Tour in various locations and was released on June 21, 2019. In 2020, Rector will headline The Old Friends Acoustic Tour, performing acoustic versions of his songs, featuring opener Cody Fry.

On December 26, 2021, Rector announced his eighth studio album, The Joy of Music, would be released in March 2022. Three songs from the album were pre-released on January 7, 2022: "Living My Best Life", "Dream On", and "Supernatural". A trailer for the album revealed that a short film was created in conjunction with the record and would debut with its release. Another track from the album, "Steady Love", was released on February 10, 2022.

Television 
Rector made his television debut performing "Beautiful" on Jimmy Kimmel Live! on October 14, 2013.  On April 12, 2016, he performed "Brand New" live on Conan. He made his Live with Kelly and Ryan debut on July 12, 2016, and appeared live on the Macy's Thanksgiving Day Parade on NBC on November 24, 2016. He has also performed on Today, Pickler & Ben, the 2017 Stanley Cup Finals (game 6), and Bachelor in Paradise. His songs have appeared on television shows including America's Got Talent, American Idol, Ellen DeGeneres Show, World of Dance, Heartland, Hawaii Five-O, Pretty Little Liars and Castle. "Brand New" was featured in the trailers for Edge of Seventeen and Moana, in a Weight Watchers campaign starring Oprah Winfrey, and on ads for the Olympics and the World Series.

Discography

Studio albums

Live albums

Extended plays

Singles

As lead artist

As featured artist

Music videos

Other appearances

Footnotes

References

External links 
 
 

1986 births
21st-century American musicians
Living people
Musicians from Nashville, Tennessee
Musicians from Tulsa, Oklahoma
Songwriters from Oklahoma
Songwriters from Tennessee
University of Arkansas alumni